Andrei Guțu (born 16 September 1980) is a Moldovan-Romanian weightlifter. His personal best is 318 kg.

At the 2005 World Championships he ranked 14th in the 77 kg category, with a total of 310 kg.

He competed in Weightlifting at the 2008 Summer Olympics in the 77 kg division finishing twentieth with 305 kg.

He is 5 ft 7 inches tall and weighs 154 lb.

He also competed in powerlifting at the World Championships, where he won several medals.

References

External links
 NBC profile
 Athlete Biography GUTU Andrei at beijing2008

1980 births
Living people
Moldovan male weightlifters
Romanian male weightlifters
Weightlifters at the 2008 Summer Olympics
Olympic weightlifters of Moldova
Moldovan expatriate sportspeople in Romania